Sead Bajramović (born 1 November 1973) is a Serbian retired football player.

Club career
An ethnic Bosniak, born in Novi Pazar, he started playing in his birth town club FK Novi Pazar moving afterward progressively to Second League FK Kolubara before getting to play with First League of FR Yugoslavia clubs FK Hajduk Kula and Belgrade's, FK Rad. He will also have a spell in the still recovering Bosnian League club NK Đerzelez, from Zenica, where he played in the 1999–2000 and 2000–01 seasons of the Bosnian Premier League. Until 2002 he will play with Montenegrin club FK Rudar Pljevlja that was back then still playing in the FR Yugoslavia league system. In 2002, he moved to Croatia where he played one season with Croatian First League club NK Osijek before returning to Bosnia to sign with NK Čelik Zenica to play in the Premier League of Bosnia and Herzegovina until 2009, with the exception of the 2007-08 season that he played in South Africa with Free State Stars.

References

External sources
 Celik squad with former players teams at Eufo
 Profile at NK Čelik official website

1973 births
Living people
Sportspeople from Novi Pazar
Bosniaks of Serbia
Association football defenders
Bosnia and Herzegovina footballers
FK Novi Pazar players
FK Kolubara players
FK Hajduk Kula players
FK Rad players
FK Rudar Pljevlja players
NK Osijek players
NK Čelik Zenica players
Free State Stars F.C. players
Second League of Serbia and Montenegro players
First League of Serbia and Montenegro players
Premier League of Bosnia and Herzegovina players
South African Premier Division players
Bosnia and Herzegovina expatriate footballers
Expatriate footballers in Croatia
Bosnia and Herzegovina expatriate sportspeople in Croatia
Expatriate soccer players in South Africa